The white-throated ground dove (Pampusana xanthonura) is a species of ground dove in the genus Gallicolumba.  It is classified as near-threatened.

This species was formerly in the genus Alopecoenas Sharpe, 1899, but the name of the genus was changed in 2019 to Pampusana Bonaparte, 1855 as this name has priority.

Description
This species averages  in length and weighs . The male white-throated ground dove has a chocolate brown body with white head and breast while the females are shade of brown with no white on the body.

Diet
The white-throated ground dove commonly feeds on fruit and occasionally feeds on insects, seeds and leaves.

Behaviour
Males are seen more often than females; both are very territorial. These birds are very shy and are often hard to find in the thick forests in which they reside. The males are forage for food and fly throughout the forests they inhabit while the females usually stay hidden. The white-throated ground dove likes to sun itself.

Habitat and Distribution
The dove is frequent appearing in its natural undisturbed environment which mainly consists of native forest, it can also be found in introduced plantations or secondary forests. The dove does not migrate.
The white-throated ground dove is found on Yap and in the Northern Mariana Islands. It once inhabited Guam but the Guam population was made extinct from the predation of the introduced brown tree snake Boiga irregularis.

Reproduction
The female lays only one egg and both parents tend to the nest the pair mate for life, nests are made from intertwined twigs and are placed highly in trees. The nesting period lasts from January to March and recently fledged males court for females.

Population
The species is currently decreasing in numbers but not at a drastic rate. The white-throated ground dove is considered a concern as of its small range that it inhabits and the fact that it is unusual to find.

Voice
A deep moaning sound that gets louder in the middle of the call.

Threats
The species can still be legally hunted in the Northern Mariana Islands, the white-throated ground dove is also affected by habitat loss and the unnatural predation from introduced species.

Conservation
A conservation effort was started by the Commonwealth of the Northern Mariana Islands. It aims to monitor populations and restrict hunting in the most affected areas. The conservation effort is also setting aside land and creating barriers and setting up devices to stop invasive species from affecting population.  Future captive-breeding plans are underway.

References

 http://oldredlist.iucnredlist.org/details/22691037/0 - Retrieved 6 June 2017
 http://www.hbw.com/species/white-throated-ground-dove-alopecoenas-xanthonurus - Retrieved 6 June 2017
 http://www.mzsdocents.org/monographs/files/white_throated_ground_dove.pdf - Retrieved 6 June 2017

white-throated ground dove
Birds of Yap
Birds of Micronesia
white-throated ground dove
Taxobox binomials not recognized by IUCN